Hajji Zahera Ahmadyar Mawlayee was elected to represent Ghazni Province in Afghanistan's Wolesi Jirga, the lower house of its National Legislature, in 2005.
She is a member of the Hazara ethnic group.
She was formerly the head of the Ghazni women's shura.
She was a University Physics and Math instructor at a
medical faculty.
She has worked with non-governmental organizations.

References

Politicians of Ghazni Province
21st-century Afghan women politicians
21st-century Afghan politicians
Living people
Members of the House of the People (Afghanistan)
Hazara politicians
Year of birth missing (living people)